Sashi Rawal is a Nepali pop singer. She became popular with the song called Chahana sakiyo bahana sakiyo which was written and composed by Kali Prasad Baskota from her first album ENTRANCE released in 2007. She also release her another song Timro Haat Samai, which also focus hit in numbers of album Saathi released in 2011. She penned and composed that song by herself. After that she released song Taali Bajai Deu from album TAALI BAJAI DEU, she has gifted and dedicated this album to her mom. Rawal also involved in Melancholy, an environmental song by 365 Artists, is written, music composed and directed by Environmentalist Nipesh DHAKA in which song has been braked in Guinness World Records in entitled "Most Vocal Solos in a Song Recording" is recorded on 19 May 2016 at Radio Nepal studio.

Personal life 
Rawal was born in Kabhresthali in Kathmandu District to her father Mohan Rawal and mother Kanchi Rawal. She had a sibling Maheshwor Rawal. She spent her childhood to adulthood there.

Education

She completed her schooling from Padma Charka Boarding School and +2 from Siddhartha Vanasthali.

Discography 
 ENTRANCE (2007) "with Kali Prasad Baskota" 
SAATHI (2010)
TAALI BAJAI DEU (2014)

Awards

Award

Image Award

Kalika FM Award

References

Read more
Ritto Ritto
गायिका रावलको विवाह खर्च वृद्धवृद्धालाई

External links
Official Website

Living people
Musicians from Kathmandu
21st-century Nepalese women singers
Nepalese female models
Year of birth missing (living people)